The men's 3000 metres steeplechase event at the 1977 Summer Universiade was held at the Vasil Levski National Stadium in Sofia on 20 and 22 August.

Medalists

Results

Heats

Final

References

Athletics at the 1977 Summer Universiade
1977